Sally Sadie Singhateh (born 1977) is a Gambian poet and novelist.

Biography 
While interning at the Foundation for Research on Women's Health, Productivity and the Environment (BAFROW), she published several articles in The Voice of Young People Magazine, published by BAFROW and aimed at young people. In 1995, she won Merit's International Poetry Award. 

Singhateh earned a Bachelor of Arts in Communication and was in the process of earning a Master of Arts in Contemporary Literature in 2004. At the University of Wales, Swansea. At BAFROW, an organization that campaigns against female genital cutting in The Gambia, she worked in public relations around 2008. She then worked at the Gambian office of UNESCO, also in public relations, from 2009.

Works

Novels
 Christie's Crises, 1988
 Baby Trouble, Nairobi
 The Sun Will Soon Shine, London: Athena Press, 2004

References

1977 births
Living people
Gambian novelists
Gambian poets
Gambian women writers
Gambian women poets
Women novelists
20th-century women writers
20th-century writers
21st-century women writers